Gjoa Haven (Inuinnaqtun: Uqhuqtuuq) is a territorial electoral district (riding) for the Legislative Assembly of Nunavut, Canada.

The riding consists of the community of Gjoa Haven. The district was created prior to the 28 October 2013 general election. The community used to be in Nattilik.

Election results

2017 election

2013 election

References

Electoral districts of Kitikmeot Region
2013 establishments in Nunavut
Gjoa Haven